Space Cowboy is video game written by Scott Lamb for the Atari 8-bit family and published by Avalon Hill Microcomputer Games in 1983.

Gameplay
Space Cowboy is a game in which the Space Cowboy maneuvers along a walkway shown in three-quarter perspective, avoiding blasts from wall-mounted lasers.

Reception
Bill Wallace reviewed Space Cowboy in Space Gamer No. 70. Wallace commented that "The action is idiotic, wooden, boring after only a couple of minutes of play.  If you'd never seen Zaxxon the three-quarter perspective would be interesting, though it doesn't really contribute to play."

References

1983 video games
Avalon Hill video games
Atari 8-bit family games
Atari 8-bit family-only games
Shoot 'em ups
Space Western video games
Video games developed in the United States